Zheng Haoqian (born 16 November 1998) is a Chinese footballer currently playing as a forward for Nantong Zhiyun.

Club career
Zheng Haoqian would play for Shanghai SIPG's youth team before joining second tier club Nantong Zhiyun on 27 February 2019. He would go on to make his debut on 10 March 2019 in a league game against Shijiazhuang Ever Bright in a 2-1 defeat. He would go on to establish himself within the team and helped the club gain promotion to the top tier at the end of the 2022 China League One season.

Career statistics
.

References

External links

1998 births
Living people
Chinese footballers
Association football forwards
China League One players
Shanghai Port F.C. players
Nantong Zhiyun F.C. players